Grimdalen is a valley at Barentsøya, Svalbard. It extends from Barentsjøkulen to Ginevra Bay, at the eastern side of Grimheia. The river of Grima flows through the valley.

References

Valleys of Svalbard
Barentsøya